The men's 4×200 metre freestyle relay event at the 1948 Olympic Games took place on 2 and 3 August at the Empire Pool. The relay featured teams of four swimmers each swimming four lengths of the 50 m pool freestyle.

Medalists

Results

Heats

Heat One

Heat Two

Final

References

Swimming at the 1948 Summer Olympics
4 × 200 metre freestyle relay
Men's events at the 1948 Summer Olympics